Kanganahalli, situated about 3 km from Sannati, is an important Buddhist site where an ancient Mahastupa was built. It is on the left bank of the Bhima river in Chitapur taluk, Kalaburagi district in Karnataka, India. Nalwar is the nearest Railway station about 19 km from Sannati. The Buddhist site about 2.5 km from Chandrala Parameshwari temple of Sannati.

History

The remains of the excavations site at Kanaganahalli can be dated to between the 1st century BC to the 3rd century AD.

In circa the 1st century BC the stupa at Kanganahalli was constructed, as per the inscriptions referred to as Hama Chaitya and it was patronized by the Hinayana and Mahayana divisions of Buddhism during  the 3rd and 4th centuries AD. During the Satavahana period, the Amaravati School of art made a deep impact on the sculptural and architectural forms of Kanaganahalli region. This was indeed a period of great artistic efflorescence that gave the Maha chaitya here the most impressive form unsurpassed in the history of stupa architecture in the south India.

The sculptured panels of the medhi are distinctly of native creation. The skill of making two dimensional sculptures and the carving of typical animal motifs are also of indigenous nature. Exhibit a transition phase between the early phase of Amaravati sculptural art and the elaborately sculptured panels of Nagarjunakonda with the sculptural panels found at Kanaganahalli stupa.

The volumes of their improvement over their Amaravati counterparts. The mastery of the artist of Kanganhalli in carving the geometric patterns, floral motifs, dress and ornamentation of the contemporary times and the concept of composition of the subject matter in the large sculptured panels.
 
The Kanaganahalli Maha Stupa is the veritable gallery of eminent rulers like King Ashoka and the Shatavahana rulers (Simuka, Pulumavi) are immortalized by depicting their portraits at Kanaganahalli.

Unlike the torana of Sanchi, Madhya Pradesh, portrait of emperor Ashoka is said to have depicted there in inscription found at Kanaganahalli.

At Kanganhalli up to the anda portion of the stupa is available, although majority of the architectural members and the sculptural panels are dislodged from the original position.

ASI Excavation Site 
 

Kanaganahalli is the excavation site of the Archaeological Survey of India.

Excavation during 1994 to 1998

 During the excavations (1994 to 1998) at Kanaganahalli, found remains of a massive Stupa, many brick structures in the form of a Chaitya-griha and memorial stupas were brought to light.
 During the excavations many architectural members of the stupa found like fragments of sculptured veneering slabs, members of railings, pillars, capitals, Buddha padas (footprints), sculptures of yaksha (non-human beings) and four images of Buddha many more.
 The sculptured panels depicts various Játaka which are legendary life of Lord Buddha and portrait of many Shatavahana king.

Inscriptions

In addition to one long inscription, 145 short inscriptions were discovered from the excavations site, dating between 1st century BCE to 1st century CE. The very important discovery was the sculpture of Maurya emperor Ashoka with the label "Rayo Asoka". Kanaganahalli in Karnataka is the site with an inscription in Brahmi script reading "Ranyo Ashoka" (King Ashoka) and a sculpture of King Ashoka.

Excavation during 2000 to 2002

 During the excavations (2000 to 2002) found bare ruined remnants of a number of brick built structures like paved and sheltered passages connecting them. Also found part of a possible monastic complex to the north west of the main stupa.
 Antiquities such as lead coins bear names of Shatavahana king like Satakarni, Pulumavi and Yajnasri.
 The most important finding of the excavation include a stone sculptured slab bearing the name  Raya Ashoka . The first inscribed portrait of Ashoka (surrounded by female attendants and queens) found at Kanaganahalli, was unearthed from the ruined Buddhist stupa.

Conservation restarted in 2022.

Satavahana inscriptions
The oldest Satavahana inscription is the one found on a slab of the upper drum (medhi) of the Kanaganahalli Great Stupa mentioning year 16 of Vasisthiputra Sri Chimuka Satavahana's reign, which can be dated from ca. 110 BCE.

On another stone slab at Kanaganahalli, the king is possibly shown together with a Nagaraja, and the inscription reads:

International Buddhist Centre

An important Buddhist site, Government of Karnataka and ASI Planning to develop Kanaganahalli (and Sannati) as International Buddhist Centre.

Government of Karnataka had constituted Sannati Development Authority and had appointed senior IAS official S.M. Jamdhar as its special officer.

See also

 Sannati
 Kanakagiri
 Mauryan Empire

External links
 Rediscovering Ashoka, Vithal C Nadkarni, The Times of India, 22 March 2012
 Kanaganahalli - the Buddhist site
 Kanaganahalli Sannati conservation
 Relics of an emperor, LAKSHMI SHARATH, The Hindu, 26 October 2012
 Buddha circuit in Gulbarga 
 Photographic documentation of the Kanaganahalli Stupa site - over 1,000 photos by C. Luczanits.

Notes

1st-century BC establishments
History of Karnataka
Buildings and structures in Kalaburagi district
Archaeological sites in Karnataka
Former populated places in India
Stupas in India
Buddhist temples in India
Buddhist sites in Karnataka
Mauryan art